Campvale is a sparsely populated rural suburb of the Port Stephens local government area in the Hunter Region of New South Wales, Australia.

Geography 
Campvale is roughly rectangular in shape and consists predominantly of bushland on sandy soil. It is bisected by Richardson Road, the main east-west road between Raymond Terrace and Port Stephens. There is only one other road in the suburb, in the northeastern corner. Adjacent to Grahamstown Dam, Grahamstown Road skirts the dam, providing access from Richardson Road to Medowie.

A small number of properties are located to the north of Richardson Road, between Grahamstown Dam and the Medowie Roundabout. This is the only populated area in the suburb. It has a population of 41 people with median age of 50.

Notes

References 

Suburbs of Port Stephens Council